Richard Michael Oliver Hill, 7th Baron Sandys DL (21 July 1931 – 11 February 2013), was a British landowner and Conservative politician.

Sandys was the only son of Arthur Fitzgerald Sandys Hill, 6th Baron Sandys, and his wife Cynthia Mary (née Gascoigne), and was educated at the Royal Naval College, Dartmouth. He served with the Royal Scots Greys from 1950 to 1955, achieving the rank of Lieutenant. In 1961 he succeeded his father in the barony and took his seat on the Conservative benches in the House of Lords.

He served under Edward Heath as a Lord-in-waiting (government whip in the House of Lords) in 1974 and was an Opposition Whip in the House of Lords from 1974 to 1979. Between 1979 and 1982, he was Captain of the Yeomen of the Guard (Deputy Chief Whip in the House of Lords) in the first Conservative administration of Margaret Thatcher. Apart from his political career he was also a Deputy Lieutenant of Worcestershire in 1968.

Lord Sandys married Patricia, daughter of Captain Lionel Hall, in 1961. They had no children. Following the death of both Lord Sandys and his wife, the family seat of Ombersley Court was put up for sale.

Arms

Notes

References
Kidd, Charles, Williamson, David (editors). Debrett's Peerage and Baronetage (1990 edition). New York: St Martin's Press, 1990, 

Who's Who 2007: An Annual Biographical Dictionary. London: A & C Black, 2007.

1931 births
2013 deaths
Conservative Party (UK) Baronesses- and Lords-in-Waiting
Deputy Lieutenants of Worcestershire
Royal Scots Greys officers
Richard
Richard
Eldest sons of British hereditary barons
Sandys